Willem Johannes Witteveen (5 May 195217 July 2014) was a Dutch legal scholar, politician, and author. He was a law professor at Tilburg University (1990–2014) and a Member of the Senate for the Labour Party (1999–2007; 2013–2014). He was also the author of several books about law and politics. Witteveen was killed on 17 July 2014 when the flight he was travelling on, Malaysia Airlines Flight 17, was shot down over eastern Ukraine by Russian rebels.

Early life and education
Willem Johannes Witteveen was born on 5 May 1952 in Rotterdam in the Netherlands.

He was the son of liberal politician Johan Witteveen and Liesbeth de Vries Feijens. He was also the great-grandson of social-democratic politician Floor Wibaut. He had three brothers and a sister.

He went to a public primary Montessori school in Rotterdam and to the public secondary school Rijnlands Lyceum (1964–1970) in Wassenaar. He studied Dutch law at Leiden University (1970–1978) in Leiden.

Career
From 1979 to 1989, he worked as researcher of constitutional law at Leiden University. In 1988, he received his PhD cum laude with the dissertation De retoriek in het recht (The rhetorics of law). From 1990 to his death, he was a law professor at Tilburg University. His fields of expertise were trias politica, legislation, rhetoric, legal theory, and political theory.

Witteveen was a member of the Labour Party since 1994. He was chairman of the party platform committee of the Labour Party in 1998–99. He was a member of the Senate from 1999 to 2007, where he was chairman of the committee for Internal Affairs and the High Councils of State. In the 2007 and 2011 Senate elections, he was at an unelectable position on the candidate list.

From 2007 to his death, he was founding dean of the College of Liberal Arts at Tilburg University. From 2013 to his death, he was again a senator. He was appointed after Pauline Meurs left the Senate.

Witteveen had finished the manuscript of his book De wet als kunstwerk (The law as work of art) shortly before his death. The book was posthumously released in November 2014.

Death
Witteveen was killed on 17 July 2014 at the age of 62, along with his wife Lidwien Heerkens and their daughter Marit Witteveen. They were passengers on Malaysia Airlines Flight 17 from Schiphol in the Netherlands to Kuala Lumpur in Malaysia, when the airplane was shot down near Hrabove in Ukraine's contested eastern Donetsk region.

Personal life
Like his father, Witteveen was a Universal Sufist. In 1978, he married Lidwien Heerkens; the couple had two children, a daughter Marit and a son Freek. The family lived in Breda in North Brabant.

Bibliography 
Witteveen wrote several non-fiction books about law and politics:
(1988) De retoriek in het recht (The rhetorics of law)
(1992) Het theater van de politiek (The theater of politics)
(1996) De geordende wereld van het recht (The structured world of the law)
(2000) De denkbeeldige staat (The imaginary state)
(2002) De sociale rechtsstaat voorbij (Past the welfare state) with Bart van Klink
(2010) Het wetgevend oordeel (The legislative judgement)
(2014) De wet als kunstwerk (The law as work of art)

References

External links 

 Willem Witteveen, articles in Academische Boekengids (2000–2011)
 Willem Witteveen, articles in Socialisme & Democratie (2002–2010)
 De sociale rechtsstaat voorbij (2002), e-book at the Scientific Council for Government Policy website

1952 births
2014 deaths
Dutch legal scholars
Dutch legal writers
Dutch people murdered abroad
Dutch political writers
Ināyati Sufis
Labour Party (Netherlands) politicians
Leiden University alumni
Academic staff of Leiden University
Malaysia Airlines Flight 17 victims
Members of the Senate (Netherlands)
People from Breda
Writers from Rotterdam
Academic staff of Tilburg University
Scholars of constitutional law